Sir Roy Yorke Calne, FRCP, FRCS, FRS (born 30 December 1930) is a British surgeon and pioneer in organ transplantation.

Career
His most notable achievements are the world's first liver, heart, and lung transplant together with John Wallwork in 1987; the first successful combined stomach, intestine, pancreas, liver, and kidney cluster transplant in 1994, the first liver transplantation operation in Europe in 1968, and the first intestinal transplant in the UK in 1992.

Calne is a fellow of the Royal Society and was Professor of Surgery at Cambridge University between 1965 and 1998 where he initiated the kidney transplant program. He was Harkness Fellow at Harvard Medical School from 1960 to 1961. Much of his subsequent work has been concerned with the improvement of immunosuppression techniques aimed at prolonging the life of liver transplant recipients. He is currently the Yoah Ghim Professor of Surgery at the National University of Singapore.

Awards and honours
He was elected to the Royal Society in 1974, and was awarded the 1988 Cameron Prize for Therapeutics of the University of Edinburgh. He was awarded the 1984 Lister Medal for his contributions to surgical science. The corresponding Lister Oration, given at the Royal College of Surgeons of England, was delivered on 21 May 1985, and was titled Organ transplantation: from laboratory to clinic. 

He was knighted in 1986. In 1990, he received the Ellison-Cliffe Medal from the Royal Society of Medicine. His portrait, commissioned by the National Portrait Gallery, was painted by John Bellany in 1991. In 2012, Calne shared the prestigious Lasker Award (Lasker-DeBakey Clinical Medical Research Award) with Dr. Thomas Starzl 'for the development of liver transplantation, which has restored normal life to thousands of patients with end-stage liver disease.'

Calne is a Distinguished Supporter of Humanists UK and he is an Honorary Vice-President of the Cambridge University Lawn Tennis Club.

Art
Calne is an artist, and is a member of the art group Group 90 in Singapore.  The Amerasinghe Ganendra Collection (Shalini Ganendra)  has a significant number of his art works  (paper, canvas, bronze) and a comprehensive collection of his art related publications.

Gallery

Bibliography
 Ellis, Harold, 1926–, Calne, Roy Y. (Roy Yorke), Sir, 1930–  and Christopher Watson (2011) Lecture notes on general surgery (Twelfth edition). Oxford : Wiley Blackwell. .
 Calne, Roy Y. (Roy Yorke), Sir, 1930– (1970) A Gift of Life: Observations on Organ Transplantation. New York : Basic Books. , 
 Calne, Roy Y. (Roy Yorke), Sir, 1930– (1996) Art, Surgery and Transplantation. London : Williams & Wilkins Europe. ,

References

External links
 
 

1930 births
Living people
People educated at Lancing College
Harvard Medical School alumni
Academics of the University of Cambridge
Fellows of the Royal Society
British Jews
Harkness Fellows
Jewish scientists
Knights Bachelor
British humanists
Fellows of King's College London
Recipients of the Lasker-DeBakey Clinical Medical Research Award